Misako Wakamiya (born 23 May 1989) is a Japanese table tennis player. Her highest career ITTF ranking was 24.

References

1989 births
Living people
Japanese female table tennis players
Asian Games medalists in table tennis
Table tennis players at the 2010 Asian Games
Table tennis players at the 2014 Asian Games
Asian Games silver medalists for Japan
Asian Games bronze medalists for Japan
Medalists at the 2010 Asian Games
Medalists at the 2014 Asian Games